FK Bodva Moldava nad Bodvou was a Slovak football team, based in the town of Moldava nad Bodvou. The club was founded in 1919.

In 2016, the club was dissolved due to financial problems.

History 
FK Bodva Moldava nad Bodvou was initially founded in 1919. The founding members were the first club: Štefan Kocsor, Štefan Eperjesi, Štefan Pózmán, Gejza Benke, Viliam Öschläger, Ladislav Hübs, Juraj Lucz and others dedicated officers in pre-war years, such as: Štefan Dittel, Štefan Szmolnický, Gregor Bakacsi, Dr. Schürger. The first chairman was then chemist Július Blum and the first coach was the local Roman Catholic priest Štefan Eperjesi since 1925 - 1938. The first start in the competition organized football: 2 August 1937 PTVE Prešov - SZSC Moldava nad Bodvou 1:1. Team was accepted into the union and included in the competition for championship fights in the northern district MLSZ - Magyar Labdarúgó Szövetség. 29 April 1946 was founded a new club called "Športový klub Moldava nad Bodvou". Club plays its home games at the stadium Steel Slovakia aréna with a capacity of 2.500 seats. Before the 2. liga season 2012/2013 Moldava checked out from the competition due to financial problems.

Previous names
 Szepsi Testedző kör
 Moldavský telovýchovný spolok
 Szepsi Sport Club
 ŠK Moldava
 Sokol NV Moldava
 Slovan Moldava
 Traktor Moldava
 Dukla Moldava
 Jednota Moldava
 Jednota STS Moldava
 TJ Jednota Moldava
 1. FC Moldava
 TJ Tesla Moldava
 TJ FC MSS Moldava
 ŠK Bodva Moldava nad Bodvou
 FK Bodva Moldava nad Bodvou

References

External links 
  

 
Defunct football clubs in Slovakia
Association football clubs established in 1919
Association football clubs disestablished in 2016
FK Bodva Moldava nad Bodvou